Oneus (Korean: 원어스, pronounced as "One Us") is a South Korean boy band formed by RBW. The group consists of five members: Seoho, Leedo, Keonhee, Hwanwoong and Xion. Originally a six member group, Ravn left the group on October 27, 2022. The group released their debut extended play Light Us on January 9, 2019.

History

2017–2018: Pre-debut
Individual members of Oneus came out of various trainee programs. Seoho, then known as Gunmin, Keonhee and Hwanwoong were trainees for RBW in the second season of Produce 101 during the first half of 2017, and Ravn and Seoho were trainees for RBW on the YG survival show Mix Nine during the second half of 2017. Leedo also participated in Mix Nine as an independent trainee, but did not pass the first audition. 

RBW started a pre-debut project "RBW Trainee Real Life – We Will Debut" in late 2017, to showcase the label's promising male trainees. Produce 101 frontrunners Keonhee and Hwanwoong were the first to join the lineup. In December 2017, They participated in the second chapter 'Special Party' with their label-mates MAS. In early 2018, Keonhee and Hwanwoong, with the addition of Ravn and Seoho, were introduced as pre-debut team RBW Boyz, with Leedo and Xion added in March 2018. They were renamed Oneus in June 2018. On September 27, Oneus and their label-mates Onewe (formerly MAS) released a pre-debut single "Last Song".

2019: Debut 
The group's debut EP Light Us was released on January 9, with "Valkyrie" serving as its lead single. The single charted in the top ten of several countries' iTunes charts, including at number one in the U.S. and Australia, as well as at number fifteen on Billboard'''s World Digital Song Sales chart.

Oneus released their second EP Raise Us on May 29, with the lead single titled "Twilight". Releasing a Japanese version of the single on August 27, Oneus made their official Japanese debut. The Japanese version of "Twilight" sold more than 60,000 copies by October. The group also held their first concert in Japan, 2019 Oneus Japan 1st Live: 光差, with shows at Osaka's Zepp Namba on July 28 and Tokyo's Zepp DiverCity on August 25.

In August, the group won the "Next Artist Award" at the 2019 Soribada Best K-Music Awards.

Oneus released their third EP Fly with Us on September 30, with the lead single titled "Lit". Following the release of the EP, they held their first tour in the U.S., also called Fly With Us in November 2019. The tour made stops in six cities: New York, Chicago, Atlanta, Dallas, Minneapolis and Los Angeles.

On December 18, they had their first Japanese comeback with the single "808". "808" debuted at number 1 on the Oricon Daily Single Chart with 3,662 copies sold on the first day of release.

2020: In Its Time, Road to Kingdom, Lived, and "Bbusyeo"
On January 10, Oneus held a fan-meeting in honor of their one-year anniversary, called Our Moment, at Yes 24 Live Hall in Seoul.

In early February, Oneus had a second concert series in Japan, Fly With Us Final, performing in Osaka on February 8 and 9 and in Chiba on February 15 and 16. The concert had 2,200 in attendance in Osaka and 3,800 in attendance in Chiba.

On March 20, it was announced that the group would join Mnet's reality television competition Road to Kingdom. For the show's finale on June 12, Oneus released their song "Come Back Home" and finished in fourth place overall.

On March 24, the group released their first single album called In Its Time with the lead single "A Song Written Easily". The song was the group's third single to chart on Billboard's World Digital Song Sales chart, ranking the highest of the three singles at number eleven.

On August 19, the group released their fourth EP Lived, with the lead single "To Be Or Not To Be".

On December 1, the group released their first digital single "Bbusyeo".

2021: Devil, Binary Code, and Blood Moon
On January 19, the group released their first studio album Devil, with the album consisting of eleven tracks, including the lead single "No Diggity".

On May 11, the group released their fifth EP Binary Code, with the lead single "Black Mirror". The EP also contained a rock version of their debut song "Valkyrie".

It was announced that Oneus would be holding an online and offline concert "Oneus Theatre: Blood Moon" in Seoul from November 6 to 7.  

On November 9, the group released their sixth EP Blood Moon, with the lead single "Luna". On November 17, the group earned their first music show win of their career with "Luna" on MBC M's Show Champion.

On December 21, Oneus released a new collaboration single with Onewe titled "Stay".

2022: Blood Moon tour, Trickster, Malus and Ravn's departure
In February 2022, Oneus began their U.S. tour, with twelve stops including major cities such as New York City and Los Angeles and smaller cities such as Wilkes-Barre and Lawrence. 

In April, Oneus announced two stops to continue their Blood Moon tour, holding their third Japanese concert with a show in Chiba and in Osaka. They also announced a comeback with their seventh EP Trickster, which was released on May 17, with the lead single "Bring It On".

On June 1, RBW released the poster "2022 Oneus Japan 1st Fanmeeting 'Summer'" via ONEUS's official SNS which is a Japanese fan meeting event that was held on June 25 and July 3.

On August 16, they announced their comeback on September 5 with their eighth EP, Malus.

On October 17, 2022, RBW announced the temporary suspension of Ravn's activities due to reports of inappropriate behavior, and until the fact check is complete. 

On October 27, 2022, RBW announced that after consideration, Ravn had made the decision to voluntarily leave the group, making Oneus a five-member group.

Members
Adapted from Naver.
Current
Seoho (서호)
Leedo (이도)
Keonhee (건희)
Hwanwoong (환웅)
Xion (시온)
Former
Ravn (레이븐)

Discography
Studio albums

Extended plays

Single album

Singles
As lead artist

Collaborations

Other songs

Tours
2019
 Debut Concert "Masterpiece" 9 January - Seoul, South Korea - Yes24 Live Hall
 Japan 1st Live "光差！" 28 July - Osaka - Zepp Namba
 25 August - Tokyo - Zepp DiverCity
 Special Live "Fly With Us" 21 September - Seoul, South Korea - Yes24 Live Hall
 1st Tour in USA "Fly With Us" 3 November - New York, New York - The Town Hall
 6 November - Chicago, Illinois - The Vic
 8 November  - Atlanta, Georgia - Center Stage
 10 November  - Dallas, Texas - Granada Theater
 13 November  - Minneapolis, Minnesota - Pentages Theatre
 15 November  - Los Angeles, California - Belasco Theatre

2020
 Japan 2nd Live "Fly With Us Final" 8-9 February - Osaka - Cool Japan Park Osaka Wwhall
 15-16 February - Urayasu, Chiba - Maihama Amphitheatre
 1st Ontact Live "Crush On Ø Us" 28 November - held online by MyMusicTaste

2021
 "Oneus Theatre: Blood Moon" 6-7 November - Seoul, South Korea - Blue Square (also held online on 7th)

2022
 2nd Tour in USA Blood Moon''
 12 February - New York, New York - Webster Hall
 13 February - Wilkes-Barre, Pennsylvania - The FM Kirby Center
 16 February - Pontiac, Michigan - The Crofoot
 19 February - Minneapolis, Minnisota - Skyway Theatre
 22 February - Orlando, Florida - The Plaza Live
 23 February - Atlanta, Georgia - Center Stage Theatre
 25 February - Cleveland, Ohio - Agora Ballroom
 26 February - Louisville, Kentucky - Paristown Hall
 1 March - Chicago, Illinois - Concord Music Hall
 3 March - Lawrence, Kansas - Liberty Hall
 6 March - Dallas, Texas - South Side Music Hall
 7 March - Houston, Texas - White Oak Music Hall
 11 March - Phoenix, Arizona - Marquee Theatre Tempe
 12 March - Beverly Hills, California - Saban Theatre

Filmography

Reality shows

Web dramas

Hosting

Awards and nominations

Notes

References

External links

 South Korean boy bands
 South Korean dance music groups
 K-pop music groups
 Musical groups established in 2018
2018 establishments in South Korea